The Lenox Hills Formation is a geologic formation in Texas. It preserves fossils dating back to the Permian period.

See also

 List of fossiliferous stratigraphic units in Texas
 Paleontology in Texas

References
 

Permian geology of Texas